Mahonia hancockiana is a species of flowering plant in the family Berberidaceae, first described in 1917. It is endemic to Yunnan Province in southwestern China.

References

hancockiana
Endemic flora of Yunnan
Plants described in 1917